Nizar (Nijhar) is one of the 7 tehsils in Tapi district in the Indian state of Gujarat.
Nizar was separated from Surat district in 2007 while Tapi district was formed. Nizar is located in the South Gujarat, about 172  km from Surat bordering Nandurbar district of Maharashtra.The official language is Gujarati.

Geography 
Location:

Geographical Location: N21 28' 27" and E74 11' 57".

Elevation: 400 ft from mean sea level

Demographics 
The total population of Nizar taluka is 129,969 during 2011 census as per 2014-15 report. The male population of which is 64,433 while female population is 65,536. The female population is 1,017 against 1,000 male as per 2014-15 report. The literacy rate of Nizar taluka is 53.39%.

Government and politics 
 Gujarat Legislative Assembly
Nizar is represented by constituency of Gujarat Legislative Assembly or Gujarat Vidhan Sabha (ગુજરાત વિધાનસભા)

Tapi 

 Parliamentary Constituency

List of Assembly Constituencies in Bardoli Parliamentary Constituency 
Nizar falls under Bardoli parliamentary constituency for Lok Sabha elections.  The table below shows the list of all the Assembly Constituencies that fall in Bardoli parliamentary constituency.

River 
Patal Ganga river flow through Nizar town. Major river Tapi is 4 km from Nizar town and flows through the Nizar Taluka. Tapi river is major source of drinking water in Nizar Taluka.

Transport 
Railway:

Nandurbar is nearest major railway station on Indian railway. Nandurbar is 17 km from Nizar. However, Major railway stations are Surat (172 km), Vadodara (198 km), Manmad (201 km) and Bhusawal (230 km).

Bus:

Gujarat: Nizar is well connected by Gujarat Maharashtra State Transport bus with major cities viz. Surat, Valsad, Ahmedabad, Vadodara, Ankleshwar. Seating bus are available from morning 04:30 hours. Nizar Ahmedabad sleeper bus (Gujarat State Transport) is available in the evening at 20:00 hours.

Maharashtra: Nizar is connected to Nandurbar, Shahada, Taloda, Akkalkuwa through Maharashtra State Transport buses. Ordinary bus are available for local travel. Private buses (seating, semi sleeper and sleeper) are available from Nandurbar and Shahada for Pune and Mumbai (overnight journey).

Madhya Pradesh: Buses for Indore are available from Nandurbar and Shahada.

Air: Nearest airport is Surat (172 km) and Indor (266 km) However, major airports are Ahmedabad (305 km), Mumbai (420 km) and Pune (457 km)

Distance to Major cities from Nizar (Nijhar):

Villages of Nizar Taluka

Education 
Nizar taluka has 113 primary schools, 21 higher schools and one college as per 2014-15 report

Schools: 
- Shir R.G. Patel Vidhyalay, Nizar. 
Sardar Vallabhbhai Vidyalaya., Nizat
- Govt. Model school Nizar
- Govt. science School Nizar
- Nizar Prarthmik Shala. 
- sai vidya Mandir school
-Late P.M.Patel English School

College: 
- Arts and Commerce College, Nizar.
-ITI Nizar

Facility  
Govt offices: 
- Nizar Taluka Panchayat 
- Nizar Gram Panchayat 
- Police station 
- Rest-house Nizar 
- Gujarat State's Electricity Board 
- Post Office 
- BSNL Office

Hospital: 
- Govt. Referral hospital, Nizar.

Industry: 
- Sumul Chilling Plan, Nizar 
- Sumul Dairy, Nizar

Markets: 
- Shri Nizar Kharid-vechan mandli, Nizar

Lodging & Boarding: 
- Patel Restaurant lodging & boarding, Shriji Restaurant lodging & boarding

Main Occupation: 
- Farming

Petrol Pump
- welcome petroleum (velda) 
-INDIAN OIL (YOGESHWAR PETROLEUM)
- Essar Petrol Pump
-balaji petroleum,
raygadh

 Bank 

 Cultural 

 Ras Garba Famous Garba Place :''' Prince chowk, Vallabh nagar

Ram Navmi 
Ram Navmi is celebrated every year in Ram Mandir from Gudhi Padva to Hanuman Jayanti

Bhagwat Saptah 
Shrimad Bhagwat Katha is held in Ram Mandir every year during Krishna Janmashtami

Makar Sankranti, Gudhi Padva, Holi, Ganesh Utsav, Navratra, Dasara, Diwali are other major festivals,

References

External links 

 

Talukas of Gujarat
Tapi district